James Walker (born 25 August 1983, in Jersey) is a professional racing driver from Great Britain.

Career

Formula Ford
Walker began his single seater racing career in 2002 in the UK Formula Ford championship, finishing the year in 17th place. He also took part in the Avon Tyres Junior Formula Ford series, finishing 6th, and the end-of-season Formula Ford Festival at Brands Hatch, where he finished 12th.

For 2003 he stayed in UK Formula Ford, winning the scholarship class for year-old cars as well as taking three overall podium finishes, including a win at Mondello Park. He also finished 9th in the Formula Ford Festival. As a result of his achievements during the season he was nominated for the National Racing Driver of the Year at the annual Autosport Awards.

Formula Three
The following year Walker moved up to the British Formula Three Championship, the first of three seasons in the category. Competing for Hitech Racing, he finished his first season in 18th place. He also raced in the one-off Formula 3 European Cup event, finishing 11th, and the Marlboro Masters at Zandvoort, where he finished in 28th place. During the same year, he was also awarded 'Rising Star' status by the British Racing Drivers Club.

In 2005 he switched to the Fortec Motorsport team, taking one race win, at the Nürburgring, to finish the year 11th overall. He once again took part in the Marlboro Masters race, but retired from the event. Walker returned to Hitech Racing for the 2006 season, taking three podium places on his way to 9th in the final standings. He also took part in two F3 Euroseries rounds, at Hockenheim and Brands Hatch, but failed to score a point in the four races he entered. Walker also made a third attempt at the renamed BP Ultimate Masters of Formula 3, but once again failed to finish the race.

World Series by Renault

For 2007 Walker made the step up to the World Series by Renault with Fortec Motorsport, who were also making their debut in the series. He finished his maiden year 19th in the final standings, with the highlight being a win in front of his home crowd at Donington Park.

Despite testing for Red Devil Team Comtec during the off-season, Walker stayed with Fortec for a second season in 2008. During the year, he finished in the points on nine occasions, taking a single podium in the final race of the season in Barcelona to finish 13th in the championship.

In the off-season, Walker tested for both Ultimate Signature and P1 Motorsport before joining the latter for the 2009 season. He ended up fifth in the championship, winning a single race at Spa-Francorchamps.

Superleague Formula
In 2008, Walker also took part in four races of the inaugural Superleague Formula season. He raced for Rangers F.C. at the Nürburgring and then for Borussia Dortmund at Jerez, where he won the final race of the season. He will return to the series in 2010, driving for defending champions Liverpool, replacing Adrián Vallés.

Sports car racing
Walker was given a drive a Porsche for J Lowe Racing in the 2010 24 Hours of Daytona, but the car retired before he got behind the wheel.

Walker joined Le Mans Series team JMW Motorsport for the 2011 season. He and Rob Bell got two class wins out of five races driving a Ferrari 458 Italia, resulting runners-up in the GTE-Pro drivers and teams championships. In 2012 he won the Paul Ricard race for JMW together with Jonny Cocker, and retired at the 24 Hours of Le Mans.

The driver swtichted to Delta-ADR for the 2013 FIA World Endurance Championship. Driving an Oreca-Nissan, he got a LMP2 class win, a fourth-place finish and a fifth, resulting 6th in the teams standings.

Racing record

Career summary

Complete Formula Renault 3.5 Series results
(key) (Races in bold indicate pole position) (Races in italics indicate fastest lap)

Superleague Formula

2008
(Races in bold indicate pole position) (Races in italics indicate fastest lap)

2010

24 Hours of Le Mans results

References

External links

1983 births
Living people
Jersey motorsport people
British racing drivers
Superleague Formula drivers
British Formula Three Championship drivers
Formula 3 Euro Series drivers
Formula Ford drivers
24 Hours of Daytona drivers
World Series Formula V8 3.5 drivers
European Le Mans Series drivers
24 Hours of Le Mans drivers
British GT Championship drivers
FIA World Endurance Championship drivers
WeatherTech SportsCar Championship drivers
Alan Docking Racing drivers
Fortec Motorsport drivers
Hitech Grand Prix drivers
P1 Motorsport drivers
Greaves Motorsport drivers